Federico Furlan (born 25 November 1990) is an Italian professional footballer who plays as a midfielder for  club Latina on loan from Ternana.

Club career 
A product of A.C. Milan youth system, Furlan spent the 2009–10 season on loan at San Marino, before joining Varese in a co-ownership deal. In January 2011, he was sent out on loan to Monza for the remainder of the 2010–11 season.
On 23 June 2011 Varese purchased 100% of the economic rights of the player from AC Milan.

On 9 August 2018, Furlan signed to Serie A side Sampdoria for free. He was immediately loaned out to Ternana for the 2018–19 season with an option to buy. At the end of the season, Ternana triggered the option.

On 13 July 2022, Furlan was loaned to Triestina for the season, with an obligation to buy in case of Triestina's promotion to Serie B. On 31 January 2023, he moved on a new loan to Latina.

Career statistics

References

External links 
 Profile at Assocalciatori.it  
 

1990 births
People from Montebelluna
Sportspeople from the Province of Treviso
Footballers from Veneto
Living people
Italian footballers
Italy youth international footballers
Association football midfielders
Calcio Montebelluna players
A.C. Milan players
A.S.D. Victor San Marino players
S.S.D. Varese Calcio players
A.C. Monza players
Bassano Virtus 55 S.T. players
Ternana Calcio players
S.S.C. Bari players
Brescia Calcio players
U.S. Triestina Calcio 1918 players
Latina Calcio 1932 players
Serie B players
Serie C players